Bruno Le Stum (born 25 December 1959) is a retired French long-distance runner who specialized in the 5000 metres and cross-country running.

He was born in Le Havre, but represented the club Montpellier PSC. He competed at the 1987 World Championships, the 1988 Olympic Games and the 1991 World Championships without reaching the final. On the regional level he won the silver medal at the 1989 Jeux de la Francophonie, he finished eighth at the 1990 European Championships and eighteenth—in the marathon—at the 1994 European Championships. His personal best time was 8.15.28 minutes, achieved in July 1991 in Nice.

At the World Cross Country Championships he recorded many top placements. He finished ninth in 1987 (fifth in the team competition), eleventh in 1989 (fourth in the team competition), and tenth in 1992 (silver medal in the team competition).

References

1959 births
Living people
French male long-distance runners
French male marathon runners
French male steeplechase runners
Athletes (track and field) at the 1988 Summer Olympics
Athletes (track and field) at the 1992 Summer Olympics
Olympic athletes of France
Sportspeople from Montpellier
World Athletics Championships athletes for France
Sportspeople from Le Havre
20th-century French people